Ninestiles Academy is a secondary school with academy status in Acocks Green, Birmingham, England. It is a mixed comprehensive academy with nearly 1,500 students.

Associations
Ninestiles is part of the Summit Learning Trust. The school was granted Technology College status in 1997 and became a foundation school in 1999. The school became an academy in 2011.

Ninestiles is also connected with Fox Hollies Leisure Centre, giving the school access to a swimming pool, squash and badminton facilities, an astroturf pitch and a large field generally used for rugby, cricket and other outdoor sports.

Structure
The school was previously known as Harrison Barrow Grammar School for Girls and Hartfield Crescent. In 2003 a new building was built onto the site of Ninestiles, known as the ICT and Business Studies Block. The Building came into use for 2004, providing more ICT and Business Study Rooms.

In 2005, the school changed the length of its lessons to two and a half hours apiece. This, five years later was changed to one hour forty minutes to allow students to cope better with the lesson being shorter, therefore this would also make it easier for teachers not having to plan lessons as long. The change required some adaptation on the part of the school's faculty, including rotating subjects and planning extended trips. In 2016 the length of lessons were changed to one hour and fifteen minutes, allowing for there to be four lessons and for it to be easier for teachers to plan lessons.

At the beginning of the 2008-2009 school term, Ninestiles School changed to a system in which pupils from different year groups were placed in the same forms. They were split into six "colleges" called Red, Blue, Orange, Yellow, Green and Purple to represent the colours of the rainbow. The school has said that this will be an effective way for pupils to bond with other students of different ages, and also have the older students helping the younger ones.

Additional upgrades to the school include a bigger student support Centre, new carpets, walls and furniture. In 2007, the school introduced Challenge Week (now known as activities week), an end-of-year event in which students have an opportunity to participate in trips and activities. In 2009 a new feature was introduced, TAG (talents, gifts and abilities) to give students an opportunity to participate in a new activity that they haven't tried before or to take part in an activity that they enjoy. TAG has not taken place since 2014.

The school is also partially selective by means of an entrance examination. 10% of places are given to children who have academic ability. Students are drawn from a wide area and the school is heavily over-subscribed.[1]

Ofsted report 
An Ofsted inspection of Ninestiles in December 2019, judged the school to be 'good' in overall effectiveness. It also judged the quality of education, behaviour and attitudes, personal development and leadership and management to be 'good'.

Controversy 
In October 2018, Ninestiles Secondary School provoked concern after it announced that students would be banned from talking in designated "quiet" areas. News of the rule change was explained in a letter sent to parents. The letter explained that students would be required to remain silent while moving "to and from assembly, at lesson changeover and towards communal areas at break and lunch”. The rule was justified on the grounds that the policy would ensure children arrived "calmly and ready to learn".

References

External links
Ninestiles Academy official website

Academies in Birmingham, West Midlands
Secondary schools in Birmingham, West Midlands